"Communication" is an instrumental composition by Dutch DJ and producer Armin. It was initially released on 19 July 1999 as 12" vinyl in the Netherlands by Cyber Records. A vocal version  of the track featuring Carmen Van Den Brakel was released the next year. The track is known as one of the favourite of Armin van Buuren's fanbase. The track reached a notable success in the United Kingdom. It is the first single from Armin's first studio album, 76.

Armin continued then to produce remixes of the track, including "Communication Part 3" released on 2 April 2007 which is the fourth single of Armin's compilation 10 Years.

Background and release 
In an interview with Musikexpress, Armin explained that he produced the track alone for 2 days in his parents' house of Leiden. He declared that he was inspired by Speedy J's Ginger album.

Music video 
An animated music video was realised for the track 12 years after its official release. It was published on 24 November 2009 by Armada Music's Youtube channel. It shows a robot in front of a conveyor belt fixing metal plates on the wall with Armin van Buuren's logo. Later the robots shares some data towards satellite dishes. At the end, the robot plays the UK CD single of "Communication".

Track listing 
Netherlands - 12" - Cyber 
 "Communication" (Original Mix) – 9:35
 "Communication" (Vincent de Moor Mix) – 7:25

Netherlands - CD - Combined Forces
 "Communication" (Pronti & Kalmani Vocal Radio Edit) – 3:44
 "Communication" (Pronti & Kalmani Instrumental Radio Edit) – 3:42
 "Communication" (Original 12" Version) – 9:35
 "Communication" (Vincent de Moor Remix) – 7:25
 "Communication" (Quake Remix) - 8:45
 "Communication" (Jon Vesta Remix) - 8:56

Europe - CD - Combined Forces
 "Communication" (Pronti & Kalmani Vocal Radio Edit) – 3:44
 "Communication" (Original Version) – 9:34

UK - 12" - AM PM 
 "Communication" (Original 12" Mix) – 6:44
 "Communication" (Jon Vesta Remix) – 6:07
 "Communication" (Quake Remake) - 6:59

UK - CD - AM PM 
 "Communication" (Radio Edit) – 3:28
 "Communication" (Quake Radio Edit) – 2:38
 "Communication" (Original 12" Mix)  – 6:44
 "Communication" (Quake Remake) – 6:59

"Communication Part 2" - Netherlands - 12" - Cyber 
 "Communication" (Armin van Buuren's Remake) – 9:35
 "Communication" (Ben Liebrand Electromix) – 6:21

"Communication Part 3" - Netherlands - 12" & Digital download - Armind 
 "Communication Part 3" (Original Mix) – 8:29
 "Communication Part 3" (Coldware Cold Remix) – 8:17

"Communication Part 3" (Remixes) - Netherlands- Digital download - Armind 
 "Communication Part 3" (John Askew Remix) – 7:06
 "Communication Part 3" (James Dymond Remix) – 7:49
 "Communication Part 3" (Tomas Heredia Remix) – 7:20
 "Communication Part 3" (Faruk Sabanci Remix) – 6:30
 "Communication Part 3" (John Askew Radio Edit) – 4:20
 "Communication Part 3" (James Dymond Radio Edit) – 5:04
 "Communication Part 3" (Faruk Sabanci Radio Edit) – 4:02
 "Communication Part 3" (Tomas Heredia Radio Edit) – 4:04

2013 Re-issue - Netherlands - Digital download - Armada digital 
 "Communication" – 3:19
 "Communication" (Album Mix) – 4:16
 "Communication" (Original Mix)  – 9:40

Paul Oakenfold Full on Fluoro Mix - UK - Digital download - Perfecto 
 "Communication" (Paul Oakenfold Full on Fluoro Mix) – 7:40

Paul Oakenfold Full on Fluoro Mixes - UK - Digital download - Perfecto 
 "Communication" (Paul Oakenfold Full on Fluoro Radio Edit) – 3:16
 "Communication" (Paul Oakenfold Full on Fluoro Mix)  - 7:40

David Gravell Remix - Netherlands - Digital download - Armind 
 "Communication" (David Gravell Extended Remix) - 4:54

David Gravell Remixes - Netherlands - Digital download - Armind 
 "Communication" (David Gravell Remix) - 2:57
 "Communication" (David Gravell Extended Remix) - 4:54

Charts

References 

1999 songs
1999 singles
2007 singles
Armin van Buuren songs
Songs written by Armin van Buuren
Armada Music singles